Coyote Mountain is a mountain of the Santa Rosa Mountains range, in eastern San Diego County, California.

It is located in the eastern Colorado Desert, within Anza-Borrego Desert State Park.

There are campgrounds for vacationers, as well as a local campground for local school children.

References

External links
 

Mountains of San Diego County, California
Santa Rosa Mountains (California)
Anza-Borrego Desert State Park
Geography of the Colorado Desert
Mountains of Southern California